Lestes malabaricus is a species of damselfly in the family Lestidae. It is native to Sri Lanka, South India and Andaman Islands.

It looks very similar to Lestes elatus and can only be distinguished by the shape of the superior and inferior anal appendages, and by the absence of the ventro-lateral black spot on the thorax.

See also
 List of odonata of Kerala
 Malabar region
  — ecoregion.

References

External links
Biodiversity India.org: Lestes malabaricus

M
Odonata of Asia
Damselflies of Sri Lanka
Insects of India
Malabar Coast moist forests
Insects described in 1929